Ladon may refer to:

Geography
Ladon (river) in Arcadia, Greece
Ladon (river of Elis) in Elis, Greece
Ladon, Loiret, a commune in the Loiret département of France

Games
Ladon (playing card), a low value card in Tarock (Tarot) games
Ladon, the dragon god in the video game Breath of Fire III

Mythology
Ladon (mythology), one of the dragons in Greek mythology